This is a list of film series that have ten entries.

A

Adams Apples (Ghana)
Adams Apples: The Family Ties (2011)
Adams Apples: Twisted Connections (2011)
Adams Apples: Musical Chairs (2011)
Adams Apples: Torn (2011)
Adams Apples: Duplicity (2011)
Adams Apples: Showdown (2011)
Adams Apples: Confessions (2011)
Adams Apples: Fight or Flight (2012)
Adams Apples: Rescue Mission (2012)
Adams Apples: New Beginnings (2012)
Asterix (A)
Asterix the Gaul (1967)
Asterix and Cleopatra (1968)
The Twelve Tasks of Asterix (1976)
Asterix Versus Caesar (1985)
Asterix in Britain (1986)
Asterix and the Big Fight (1989)
Asterix Conquers America (1994)
Asterix and the Vikings (2006)
Asterix: The Mansions of the Gods (2014)
Asterix: The Secret of the Magic Potion (2018)
Anaconda vs. Lake Placid
Anaconda (1997) 
Lake Placid (1999)
Anacondas: The Hunt for the Blood Orchid (2004)
Lake Placid 2 (2007) (TV)
Anaconda 3: Offspring (2008) (TV)
Anacondas: Trail of Blood (2009) (TV)
Lake Placid 3 (2010) (TV)
Lake Placid: The Final Chapter (2012) (TV)
Lake Placid vs. Anaconda (2015) (TV) (crossover)
Lake Placid: Legacy (2018) (TV)

B

Black Emanuelle
Emanuelle nera (1975)
Emanuelle nera nº 2 (1976) (unofficial)
Emanuelle nera orient reportage (1976)
Emanuelle in America (1977)
Emanuelle – Perche Violenza alle Donne? (1977)
Suor Emanuelle (1977)
Emanuelle e gli ultimi cannibali (1977)
La Via della prostituzione (1978)
Violenza in un carcere femminile (1982)
Emanuelle fuga dall'inferno (1983)

C

Corporal Rod Webb
Trail of the Yukon (1949)
The Wolf Hunters (1949)
Snow Dog (1950)
Call of the Klondike (1950)
Northwest Territory (1951)
Yukon Manhunt (1951)
Yukon Gold (1952)
Fangs of the Arctic (1953)
Northern Patrol (1953)
Yukon Vengeance (1954)
Crime Doctor
Crime Doctor (1943)
Crime Doctor's Strangest Case (1943)
Shadows in the Night (1944)
Crime Doctor's Warning (1945)
The Crime Doctor's Courage (1945)
Just Before Dawn (1946)
Crime Doctor's Man Hunt (1946)
The Millerson Case (1947)
Crime Doctor's Gamble (1947)
The Crime Doctor's Diary (1949)
Children of the Corn
Children of the Corn (1984)
Children of the Corn II: The Final Sacrifice (1992)
Children of the Corn III: Urban Harvest (1995)
Children of the Corn IV: The Gathering (1996) (V)
Children of the Corn V: Fields of Terror (1998) (V)
Children of the Corn 666: Isaac's Return (1999) (V)
Children of the Corn: Revelation (2001) (V)
Children of the Corn: Genesis (2011) (V)
Children of the Corn: Runaway (2018) (V)
Children of the Corn (2020)

E

Ellery Queen **
The Spanish Cape Mystery (1935)
The Mandarin Mystery (1936)
Ellery Queen, Master Detective (1940)
Ellery Queen's Penthouse Mystery (1941)
Ellery Queen and the Perfect Crime (1941)
Ellery Queen and the Murder Ring (1941)
A Close Call for Ellery Queen (1942)
A Desperate Chance for Ellery Queen (1942)
Enemy Agents Meet Ellery Queen (1942)
Ellery Queen: Don't Look Behind You (1971) (TV)
Enteng Kabisote *
Okay Ka, Fairy Ko!: The Movie (1991)
Okay Ka, Fairy Ko!: Part 2 (1992)
Enteng Kabisote: Okay Ka, Fairy Ko: The Legend (2004)
Enteng Kabisote 2: Okay Ka Fairy Ko: The Legend Continues (2005)
Enteng Kabisote 3: Okay Ka, Fairy Ko: The Legend Goes On and On and On (2006)
Enteng Kabisote 4: Okay Ka, Fairy Ko: The Beginning of the Legend (2007)
Si Agimat at si Enteng Kabisote (2010)Enteng ng Ina Mo (2011)
Si Agimat, si Enteng Kabisote at si Ako (2012)Enteng Kabisote 10 and the Abangers (2016)

F

Fantozzi
Fantozzi (1975)
Il secondo tragico Fantozzi (1976)
Fantozzi contro tutti (1980)
Fantozzi subisce ancora (1983)
Superfantozzi (1986)
Fantozzi va in pensione (1988)
Fantozzi alla riscossa (1990)
Fantozzi in paradiso (1993)
Fantozzi - Il ritorno (1996)
Fantozzi 2000 - La clonazione (1999)
The Flintstones ************* (a)
The Man Called Flintstone (1966)
A Flintstone Christmas (1977) (TV)
The Flintstones: Little Big League (1978) (TV)
The Flintstones Meet Rockula and Frankenstone (1979) (TV)
The Jetsons Meet the Flintstones (1987) (TV)
I Yabba-Dabba Do! (1993) (TV)
Hollyrock-a-Bye Baby (1993) (TV)
A Flintstones Christmas Carol (1994) (TV)
The Flintstones: On the Rocks (2001) (TV)
The Flintstones & WWE: Stone Age SmackDown! (2015) (V)
Foolish Years
Lude godine (Wacky Years), 1977)
Došlo doba da se ljubav proba (The Time has Come to Taste the Love) a.k.a. Lude godine II (Wacky Years II, 1980)
Ljubi, ljubi, al' glavu ne gubi (Kiss, Kiss, but Don't Lose Your Head, 1981)
Kakav deda takav unuk (Like Grandpa, Like Grandson, 1983)
Idi mi, dođi mi (Come to me and Go from me, 1983)
Šta se zgodi kad se ljubav rodi (What Happens When Love Comes to Town, 1984)
Žikina dinastija (Žika's Dynasty, 1985)
Druga Žikina dinastija (Second Žika's Dynasty, 1986)
Sulude godine (Weird Years, 1988)
Žikina ženidba (Žika's Wedding, 1992), also known as Ženidba Žike Pavlovića (The Wedding of Žika Pavlović) in Croatia

H

Hanna-Barbera Superstars 10 ****** (A)
Yogi's Great Escape (1987) (TV)
Scooby-Doo Meets the Boo Brothers (1987) (TV)
The Jetsons Meet the Flintstones (1987) (TV)
Yogi Bear and the Magical Flight of the Spruce Goose (1987) (TV)
Top Cat and the Beverly Hills Cats (1988) (TV)
The Good, the Bad, and Huckleberry Hound (1988) (TV)
Rockin' with Judy Jetson (1988) (TV)
Scooby-Doo and the Ghoul School (1988) (TV)
Scooby-Doo and the Reluctant Werewolf (1988) (TV)
Yogi and the Invasion of the Space Bears (1988) (TV)
Hellraiser
Hellraiser (1987)
Hellbound: Hellraiser II (1988)
Hellraiser III: Hell on Earth (1992)
Hellraiser: Bloodline (1996)
Hellraiser: Inferno (2000) (V)
Hellraiser: Hellseeker (2002) (V)
Hellraiser: Deader (2005) (V)
Hellraiser: Hellworld (2005) (V)
Hellraiser: Revelations (2011) (V)
Hellraiser: Judgment (2018) (V)

I
In the Line of Duty
In the Line of Duty: The F.B.I. Murders (1988) (TV)
In the Line of Duty: A Cop for the Killing (1990) (TV)
In the Line of Duty: Manhunt in the Dakotas (1991) (TV)
In the Line of Duty: Street War (1992) (TV)
In the Line of Duty: Ambush in Waco (1993) (TV)
In the Line of Duty: The Price of Vengeance (1994) (TV)
In the Line of Duty: Kidnapped (1995) (TV)
In the Line of Duty: Hunt for Justice (1995) (TV)
In the Line of Duty: Smoke Jumpers (1996) (TV)
In the Line of Duty: Blaze of Glory (1997) (TV)

M

Ma and Pa Kettle
The Egg and I (1947)
Ma and Pa Kettle (1949)
Ma and Pa Kettle Go to Town (1950)
Ma and Pa Kettle Back on the Farm (1951)
Ma and Pa Kettle at the Fair (1952)
Ma and Pa Kettle on Vacation (1953)
Ma and Pa Kettle at Home (1954)
Ma and Pa Kettle at Waikiki (1955)
The Kettles in the Ozarks (1956)
The Kettles on Old MacDonald's Farm (1957)
Maisie
Maisie (1939)
Congo Maisie (1940)
Gold Rush Maisie (1940)
Maisie Was a Lady (1941)
Ringside Maisie (1941)
Maisie Gets Her Man (1942)
Swing Shift Maisie (1943)
Maisie Goes to Reno (1944)
Up Goes Maisie (1946)
Undercover Maisie (1947)
The Man from U.N.C.L.E.
To Trap a Spy (1964)
The Spy with My Face (1965)
One Spy Too Many (1966)
One of Our Spies Is Missing (1966)
The Spy in the Green Hat (1966)
The Karate Killers (1967)
The Helicopter Spies (1968)  
How to Steal the World (1968)
Return of the Man from U.N.C.L.E.: The Fifteen Years Later Affair (1983) (TV)
The Man from U.N.C.L.E. (2015)
McBride
McBride: Murder Past Midnight (2005) (TV)
McBride: The Chameleon Murder (2005) (TV)
McBride: It's Murder, Madam (2005) (TV)
McBride: The Doctor Is Out... Really Out (2005) (TV)
McBride: Tune in for Murder (2005) (TV)
McBride: Anybody Here Murder Marty? (2005) (TV)
McBride: Fallen Idol (2006) (TV)
McBride: Dogged (2007) (TV)
McBride: Semper Fi (2008) (TV)
McBride: Requiem (2009) (TV)
Monte Hale
Home on the Range (1946)
Man from Rainbow Valley (1946)
Out California Way (1946)
Last Frontier Uprising (1947)
Along the Oregon Trail (1947)
Under Colorado Skies (1947)
California Firebrand (1948)
The Timber Trail (1948)
Son of God's Country (1948)
Trail of Robin Hood (1950)

S

Sansone
Sansone contro i Filistei (1919)
Sansone e la ladra di atleti (1919)
Sansone muto (1919)
I figli di Sansonia (1920)
Sansone burlone (1920)
Sansonette amazzone dell'aria (1920)
Sansonette danzatrice della prateria (1920)
Sansone e i rettili umani (1920)
Sansonette e i quattro arlecchini (1920)
Sansone l'acrobata del Kolossal (1920)
Saw
Saw (2004)
Saw II (2005)
Saw III (2006)
Saw IV (2007)
Saw V (2008)
Saw VI (2009)
Saw 3D (2010)
Jigsaw (2017) 
Spiral (2021)
Saw X (2023)
The Swan Princess (A)
The Swan Princess (1994)
The Swan Princess II: Escape from Castle Mountain (1996)
The Swan Princess: The Mystery of the Enchanted Kingdom (1997)
The Swan Princess Christmas (2012)
The Swan Princess: A Royal Family Tale (2014)
The Swan Princess: Princess Tomorrow, Pirate Today! (2016)
The Swan Princess: Royally Undercover (2017)
The Swan Princess: A Royal Myztery (2018)
The Swan Princess: Kingdom of Music (2019)
The Swan Princess: A Royal Wedding (2020)

T

The Three Supermen
The Three Fantastic Supermen (1967)
3 Supermen a Tokyo (1968)
 (1970)
Supermen Against the Orient (1973)
 (1973)
Three Supermen and Mad Girl (1973)
Super Stooges vs. the Wonder Women (1974)
Three Supermen Against Godfather (1979)
Three Supermen at the Olympic Games (1984)
Three Supermen in Santo Domingo (1986)
Tim Holt
Masked Raiders (1949)
The Mysterious Desperado (1949)
Gunplay (1951)
Pistol Harvest (1951)
Hot Lead (1951)
Overland Telegraph (1951)
Trail Guide (1952)
Road Agent (1952)
Target (1952)
Desert Passage (1952)
Tinieblas (a.k.a. Tinieblas el Gigante)
Las Momias de Guanajuato (1970)
Los Campeones justicieros (1971) (a.k.a. The Champions of Justice)
Superzan el invencible (1971)
Una Rosa sobre el ring (1973)
El Castillo de las momias de Guanajuato (1973) (a.k.a. The Castle of the Mummies of Guanajuato)
Leyendas macabras de la colonia (1974)
Las Momias de San Ángel (1975)
El Investigador Capulina (1975)
El Puño de la muerte (1982)
La Furia de los karatecas (1982) (a.k.a. Fury of the Karate Killers)

Z

Zero Woman
Zeroka no onna: Akai wappa (Zero Woman: Red Handcuffs) (1974)
Zero Woman: Keishichô 0-ka no onna (Zero Woman: Final Mission) (1995)
Zero Woman 2 (1995)
Zero Woman III: Keishichô 0-ka no onna (Zero Woman: Assassin Lovers) (1996)
Zero Woman: Namae no nai onna (Zero Woman: The Accused) (1997)
Zero Woman: Kesenai kioku (Zero Woman: The Hunted) (1997)
Zero Woman: Abunai yûgi (Zero Woman: Dangerous Game) (1998)
Zero Woman: Saigo no shirei (Zero Woman Returns) (1999)
Shin Zero Ûman-0-ka no onna: futatabi... (Zero Woman 2005) (2004)
Zero Woman R (2007)

10